The Mirar Toolbar, also known as Mirar, is an adware application that is typically installed as a bundle with other software. It is often installed without user consent.

Mirar installs itself into the C:\Windows directory. It monitors web browsing and search activity so that targeting advertising can be served to users. All of the information is sent to Mirar's servers. Because of this behavior, Mirar can be called spyware. Mirar also installs its search toolbar into Internet Explorer as a Browser Helper Object (BHO).

Citations

Adware